Crawford County Airport  is a public use airport located four nautical miles (5 mi, 7 km) east of the central business district of Robinson, a city in Crawford County, Illinois, United States. It is owned by the Crawford County Airport Authority and was formerly known as Robinson Municipal Airport. This airport is included in the National Plan of Integrated Airport Systems for 2011–2015, which categorized it as a general aviation facility.

Although many U.S. airports use the same three-letter location identifier for the FAA and IATA, this facility is assigned RSV by the FAA but has no designation from the IATA.

History
The airport was built by the United States Army Air Forces during 1942/43 as an axillary airfield for George Army Airfield, near Lawrenceville, Illinois.  It was known simply as George Army Airfield Auxiliary #4.  The two runways in use today were built during that period.   It was used to help train medium bomber and transport pilots, who used it for emergencies on it or practiced touch-and-go landings.   It was not manned, and at the end of World War II it was simply abandoned and the land turned over to local authorities, like many other small auxiliary airfields.

About 1951, Crawford County developed the current airport from the former military airfield.

Facilities and aircraft 
Crawford County Airport covers an area of 432 acres (175 ha) at an elevation of 462 feet (141 m) above mean sea level. It has two asphalt paved runways: 9/27 is 5,108 by 100 feet (1,557 x 23 m) and 17/35 is 3,398 by 75 feet (1,036 x 23 m).

The airport has an FBO offering full- and self-serve fuel. Line services include cargo handling, detailing, deicing, and ground handling. A lounge, snooze rooms, a flight planning kiosk, and courtesy cars are also available.

For the 12-month period ending July 31, 2021, the airport had 11,300 aircraft operations, an average of 31 per day: 92% general aviation, 7% air taxi, and <1% military. At that time, there were 17 aircraft based at this airport: 15 single-engine and 2 multi-engine airplanes.

References

External links 
 Aerial image as of February 1998 from USGS The National Map
 

Airports in Illinois
Buildings and structures in Crawford County, Illinois